In June and July 2018, a junior association football team were rescued from the Tham Luang Nang Non cave in Chiang Rai Province in northern Thailand. Twelve members of the team, aged 11 to 16, and their 25-year-old assistant coach entered the cave on 23 June after a practice session. Shortly thereafter, heavy rainfall partially flooded the cave system, blocking their way out, and trapping them deep within.

Efforts to locate the group were hampered by rising water levels and strong currents; and no contact was made for more than a week. The cave rescue effort expanded into a massive operation amid intense worldwide public interest and involving international rescue teams. Rescue organisers discussed various options for extracting the group, including whether to teach them basic underwater diving skills to enable their early rescue, to wait until a new entrance to the cave was found or drilled, or to wait for the floodwaters to subside by the end of the monsoon season several months later. After days of pumping water from the cave system and a respite from rain, the rescue teams hastened to get the group out of the cave before the next monsoon rain, which was expected to bring additional downpours and was predicted to start around 11 July.

Between 8 and 10 July, all 12 boys and their coach were rescued from the cave by an international team.

The rescue effort involved as many as 10,000 people, including more than 100 divers, scores of rescue workers, representatives from about 100 governmental agencies, 900 police officers, and 2,000 soldiers. Ten police helicopters, seven ambulances, more than 700 diving cylinders, and pumping of more than one billion litres of water from the caves were required.

Saman Gunan, a 37-year-old former Royal Thai Navy SEAL, died of asphyxiation during an attempted rescue on 6 July while returning to a staging base in the cave after delivering diving cylinders to the trapped group. The following year, in December 2019, rescue diver and Thai Navy SEAL Beirut Pakbara died of a blood infection contracted during the operation.

Background and disappearance 

Tham Luang Nang Non is a karstic cave complex beneath Doi Nang Non, a mountain range on the border between Thailand and Myanmar. Since part of the cave system is seasonally flooded, a sign advising against entering the caves during the rainy season (July–November) is posted at the entrance.

On Saturday 23 June 2018, a group of twelve boys aged between 11 and 16 from a local junior football team named the Wild Boars and their 25-year-old assistant coach, Ekkaphon Kanthawong, went missing after setting out to explore the cave. According to early news reports, they planned to have a birthday party in the cave after the football practice, and spent a significant sum of money on food, but they denied this in a news conference after the rescue. The team was stranded in the tunnels by sudden and continuous rainfall after they had entered the cave. They had to leave some food supplies behind when fleeing the rising water.

Around 7 p.m. that day, head coach Nopparat Kanthawong, who also founded the team, checked his phone, finding about twenty missed calls from parents worried that their children had not come home. Nopparat dialed assistant coach Ekkaphon and a number of the boys in quick succession, without success. Eventually, he reached Songpon Kanthawong, a 13-year-old member of the team who mentioned he was picked up after practice, and that the rest of the boys had gone exploring in the Tham Luang caves. The coach raced up to the caves, finding abandoned bicycles and bags near the entrance, with water seeping out of the muddy pathway. He alerted authorities to the missing group after seeing their unclaimed belongings.

Team members
The members of the trapped team were as follows:

The assistant coach and three of the boys had no nationality. Head coach Nopparat explained that they are from tribes in an area that extends across Thailand, Myanmar, Laos, and China. This region has no clear borders and people are not assigned passports. Their statelessness deprived them of basic benefits and rights, including the possibility to leave the Chiang Rai province. "To get nationality is the biggest hope for the boys", head coach Nopparat said. "In the past, these boys have problems travelling to play matches outside of Chiang Rai because of their nationless status." Following the team's rescue, Thai officials promised to provide the three boys and the coach with legal assistance in obtaining Thai citizenship, a process which they said could take up to six months. On 26 September, the boys and the coach were granted Thai citizenship.

Search and contact

British caver Vern Unsworth, who lives in Chiang Rai and has detailed knowledge of the cave complex, was scheduled to make a solo venture into the cave on 24 June when he received a call about the missing boys. Unsworth advised the Thai government to request assistance from the British Cave Rescue Council (BCRC). On 25 June, Thai Navy SEALs divers arrived and began searching the cave. A Thai Navy SEAL said the water was so murky that even with lights they could not see where they were going underwater. After continuous rain, which further flooded the entrance, the search had to be temporarily interrupted. On 27 June, three BCRC cave divers arrived with specialist equipment including HeyPhone radios, followed by separate teams of open water divers. On 28 June, a United States Air Force team from the 320th Special Tactics Squadron, the 31st Rescue Squadron, and the 353rd Special Operations Group joined them. By 29 June, an Australian Federal Police team of Specialist Response Group divers had arrived and on Sunday a Chinese team of divers from the Beijing Peaceland Foundation.

Meanwhile, policemen with sniffer dogs searched the surface above for shaft openings that could provide alternative entrances to the cave system below. Drones and robots were also used in the search, but no technology existed to scan for people deep underground.

BCRC divers Richard Stanton and John Volanthen advanced through the cave complex placing diving guidelines, supported by Thailand-based Belgian cave diver Ben Reymenants and French diver Maksym Polejaka. The search had to be suspended due to the weather, as rainfall increased the flow of water in the cave where the divers were battling strong currents and poor visibility. The search resumed on 2 July after the weather improved. The twelve boys and the coach were discovered at approximately 22:00 by Stanton and Volanthen, whose efforts were overseen from outside by BCRC diver Robert Harper. The boys and coach were on a narrow rock shelf about  beyond the "Pattaya Beach" chamber, named after an above-ground beach in Thailand. Volanthen had been placing guide lines in the cave to assist others in navigation when he ran out of line. He then swam to the surface and soon found the missing  group, smelling them before hearing or seeing them. A video of the encounter, showing the boys and their interactions with the divers, was posted on Facebook by the Thai Navy SEALs. Former Chiang Rai provincial governor , who was in charge of rescue work, said "We found them safe. But the operation isn't over." The Thai, US, Australian and Chinese diving teams supported by the BCRC divers began transporting diving bottles into the cave system and established an air supply storage area in Chamber 3.

On July 3rd, the trapped group was joined by three Thai Navy SEALs who supported them until the rescue. The SEALs included Thai Army doctor Lt. Col. Pak Loharachun of the 3rd Medical Battalion, who had completed the Navy SEALs course. Thai officials told reporters that rescuers were providing health checks and treatment and keeping the boys entertained, and that none of those trapped was in serious condition. "They have been fed with easy-to-digest, high-energy food with vitamins and minerals, under the supervision of a doctor", Rear Admiral Apagorn Youkonggaew, head of the Thai Navy's Special Forces, told reporters. A video made by the rescuers, and shared a few hours later by the Thai Navy SEALs, showed all twelve boys and their coach introducing themselves and stating their age. Wrapped in emergency blankets and appearing frail, they all said hello to the outside world. "Sawatdi khrap", each boy said with his palms together in wai, the traditional Thai greeting. A second video shows a medic treating them. It was believed that some of the group could not swim, complicating what would already be a difficult rescue. The Army doctor discovered that they had attempted to dig their way out of the cave. The team members had used rock fragments to dig every day, creating a hole five metres deep.

BCRC diver Jason Mallinson offered the boys and coach an opportunity to send messages to relatives by using his wet notes pad. Many of the notes said they were safe, reassured family members that everything was fine, and included words of love, reassurance and encouragement.

Planning and preparation

A logistics camp was established at the cave entrance, which accommodated hundreds of volunteers and journalists in addition to the rescue workers. The site was divided into several zones: restricted areas for the Thai Navy SEALs, other military personnel, and civilian rescuers, an area for the relatives to give them privacy, and areas for the press and for the general public.

An estimated 10,000 people contributed to the rescue effort, including more than 100 divers, representatives from about 100 government agencies, 900 police officers, 2,000 soldiers and numerous volunteers. Equipment included ten police helicopters, seven police ambulances, and more than 700 diving cylinders, of which more than 500 were in the cave at any time while another 200 were in the queue to be refilled. More than a billion litres of water (the equivalent of 400 Olympic-size swimming pools) was removed.

Challenges 
The route to them had several flooded sections, some with strong currents and zero visibility, and some extremely narrow parts, the smallest measuring only .

The journey through the cave to the boys took six hours against the current and five hours to exit with the current, even for experienced divers.

From the outset, rescue workers battled rising water levels. In an effort to drain the cave, a stone diversion dam was built upstream and systems were installed to pump water out of the cave and divert flows that were entering it. On 4 July, it was estimated that the pumps were removing  from the cave, ruining nearby farm fields in the process. For a time, well-meaning volunteers inadvertently pumped water back into the groundwater supply. However, heavy rains forecast for 8 July were expected to halt or reverse this process and could even flood the position where the team was trapped.

On 6 July, the oxygen level in the cave was detected to have dropped, raising fears that the boys might develop hypoxia if they remained for a prolonged time. By 8 July the oxygen level was measured to be 15%; the level needed to maintain normal function for humans is between 19.5% and 23.5%. Thai military engineers attempted to install an air supply line to the boys, but the effort was abandoned as impractical.

Options

As the crisis unfolded, rescuers planned several different methods to save the team and coach. The principal options were to:
 Wait until the end of the monsoon season; with divers providing food and water.
 Teach the group basic diving skills.
 Find an alternative entrance to the cave which could allow for an easier escape; one shaft was discovered that went down 900 metres.
 Drill a rescue shaft; more than 100 shafts were bored into the soft limestone, but no suitable location was found.
 Build an oxygen line.
 Build a telephone wire to communicate.

The diving option 
Multiple dangers—the threat of more heavy rain, dropping oxygen levels, and the difficulty or impossibility of finding or drilling an escape passage—forced rescuers to make the decision to bring out the team and coach with experienced divers. The Thai Navy SEALs and US Air Force rescue experts met with the Thai Minister of the Interior who approved the plan. Ninety divers worked in the cave system, forty from Thailand and fifty from other countries. Rescuers at first considered teaching the boys basic diving skills to enable them to make the journey. Organisers built a mock-up of a tight passage with chairs, and divers practiced with local boys in a school swimming pool. Thai SEALs and US Air Force experts then refined the plan to use teams of divers to bring out the weakened boys.

Death of rescue diver 

On 5 July, at 8:37 pm, Saman Kunan, a 37-year-old former Thai Navy SEAL, made a dive from Chamber 3 to the T-junction close to Pattaya Beach to deliver three air tanks. During his return he lost consciousness underwater. His dive buddy attempted CPR without success. Kunan was brought to Chamber 3 where CPR was attempted again, but he could not be resuscitated and was pronounced dead about 1 am on 6 July.

A member of Thai Navy SEALs class 30, Kunan had left the SEALs in 2006 at the rank of petty officer 1st class and was working in security at the Suvarnabhumi Airport when he volunteered to assist the cave rescue. He was posthumously promoted to lieutenant commander by the Commander-in-Chief of the Royal Thai Navy, an unprecedented rise of seven ranks. A funeral sponsored and attended by the Thai royal family was held on 14 July. On the same day, he was also awarded the Knight Grand Cross (first class) of the Most Exalted Order of the White Elephant by King Vajiralongkorn. A  memorial statue of him may form a part of a proposed tourist attraction at the site.

Another rescue diver and Thai Navy SEAL, Beirut Pakbara, died the following year from a blood infection acquired during the rescue operation.

Rescue operation 
On the morning of July 8, officials instructed the media and all non-essential personnel around the cave entrance to clear the area as a rescue operation was imminent, due to the threat of monsoon rains later in the week, which were expected to flood the cave until October.

For the first part of the extraction, eighteen rescue divers consisting of thirteen international cave divers and five Thai Navy SEALs were sent into the caves to retrieve the boys, with one diver to accompany each boy on the dive out. The international cave diving team was led by four British divers: John Volanthen, Richard Stanton, Jason Mallinson and Chris Jewell (each assigned a boy) and two Australians: Richard Harris, a physician specializing in anesthesia, and Craig Challen. Irishman Jim Warny became an additional lead diver on the final day of the rescue to bring back assistant coach Ekkaphon. The lead divers' portion of the journey would stretch over one kilometre, going through submerged routes while being supported by 90 Thai and foreign divers at various points performing medical check-ups, resupply of air tanks, and other emergency roles.

There were conflicting reports that the boys were rescued with the weakest first or strongest first. In fact, the order was which boy volunteered first. "I talked with Dr. Harris. Everyone was strong and no one was sick," Ekkaphon told the press. "Everybody had a strong mental state. Dr. Harris said... there's no preference." The team decided as a group that the boys who lived the farthest away should leave first. Ekkaphon also stated in their 18 July press conference, not realizing at the time their story had garnered global media attention: "We were thinking, when we get out of the cave, we would have to ride the bicycle home... so the persons who live the furthest away would be allowed to go out first... so that they can go out and tell everyone that we were inside, we were okay."

The boys were dressed in a wetsuit, buoyancy jacket, harness and a positive pressure full face mask. A cylinder with 80% oxygen was clipped to their front, a handle attached to their back and they were tethered to a diver in case they were lost in the poor visibility. The rescue divers described them as "a package." Harris administered the anaesthetic ketamine to the boys before the journey, rendering them "fully unconscious." This was to prevent them from panicking on the journey, which would risk their own lives as well as the lives of their rescuers. They were also given the anti-anxiety drug alprazolam and the drug atropine to steady their heart rates and reduce saliva production to prevent choking. The Thai government provided Harris and two medical assistants with diplomatic immunity in case something went wrong.

The anaesthetic lasted between 45 minutes and an hour, requiring divers, whom Harris had trained, to administer "top-up" ketamine injections during the three hour journey. The boys were maneuvered out by the swimming divers who held onto their back or chest, with each boy on either the right or left side of the diver, depending on the guideline; in very narrow spots divers pushed the boys from behind. The divers navigated them through tight passages carefully to avoid dislodging their face masks against rocks. The divers kept their heads higher than the boys so that, in poor visibility, the divers would hit their head against the rocks first. After a short dive to a dry section, the divers and boys were met by three divers, and the boys' dive gear was removed. Craig Challen assessed them, and their dive gear was put back on before they were re-submerged for the next section. The boys arrived at 45-minute intervals. The divers knew the boys were breathing from their exhaust bubbles, which they could see and feel.

After being delivered by the divers into the staging base in Chamber 3, the boys were then passed along a 'daisy chain' by hundreds of rescuers stationed along the treacherous path out of the cave. The boys, wrapped in 'sked' stretchers, would alternately be carried, slid and zip-lined over a complex network of pulleys installed by rock-climbers. Many areas from Chamber 3 to the entrance of the cave were still partially submerged and rescuers described having to transport the boys over slippery rocks and through muddy water for hours. The journey from Chamber 3 to the cave entrance took about four to five hours initially, but was reduced to less than an hour after a week of draining and clearing the mud path using shovels.

The authorities warned that extracting everyone would take several days, because crews had to replace air tanks, gear, and other supplies, requiring ten to twenty hours between each run. Shortly after 19:00, local officials said that two boys had been rescued and taken to Chiangrai Prachanukroh Hospital. Shortly after, two more boys exited the cave and were assessed by medical officials. Low water levels had reduced the time required for the rescues. The lower water was due to improved weather and the construction of a weir outside the cave to help control the water.

On 9 July, four more boys were rescued from the cave. On 10 July, the last four boys and their coach were rescued from the cave. Experience helped streamline the rescue procedure, so the total time to extract a boy was reduced from three hours on the first day to just over two hours on the final day, allowing four boys and the coach to be rescued. The three Thai Navy SEALs and the Army doctor who had stayed with the boys the entire time were the last to dive out. Three of these divers made it to Chamber 3, joining waiting rescuers when the pumps shut off for an uncertain reason, possibly due to a burst water pipe. Water levels in Chamber 3 started to rise, which would have cut off rescuers' access to Chamber 2, Chamber 1 and the entrance of the cave. "All of a sudden a water pipe burst and the main pump stopped working", a diver stated. "We really had to run from the third chamber to the entrance because the water level was rising very quickly—like 50 cm every 10 minutes." This forced up to 100 rescuers still located more than  inside the cave to evacuate in a hurry, abandoning the rescue equipment inside the cave. The last diver made it back to Chamber 3 as everyone was preparing to leave. The rescuers managed to rush to the cave exit in under an hour.

A number of news outlets reported on the role of coach Ekkaphon during the rescue. The coach had previously been a Buddhist monk, and had guided meditation for the children during the ordeal. He also passed on a message in which he apologised for putting the children in danger.

Recovery
Thai authorities said the rescued boys were able to eat rice porridge, but more complex foods would be withheld for ten days. The Thai Health Ministry said the boys lost an average of  each, but were in "good condition". The boys were quarantined while health workers determined whether they had caught any infectious diseases, and they were expected to remain hospitalised for at least one week. Due to the prolonged stay in the damp cave environment, officials were worried about potential infections such as histoplasmosis or leptospirosis. Parents of the team members initially visited looking through a window, but if laboratory results proved negative, they would be allowed to visit in person while wearing a medical gown, face mask and hair cap.

The boys wore sunglasses as a precaution while their eyes adjusted to daylight. Detailed tests of their eyes, nutrition, mental health and blood were carried out. A Health Ministry physician said all the boys showed an increase in white blood cells, so preventive antibiotic doses were given to the entire team.

Responses

Local

Residents of Chiang Rai province volunteered to cook, clean for, and otherwise support the missing team's families and the rescue teams at the encampment by the cave mouth. Social media was used to draw attention to the rescue attempts. Classmates and teachers of the team spent time chanting and praying for the missing boys. Classmates of one of the boys made 1,000 paper cranes for him, while praying for his safe return. Local schools donated money to help the parents with living costs, as many of them stopped working in order to follow the rescue attempts.

On 29 June, Prime Minister Prayut Chan-o-cha visited the search site and told the families of the boys not to give up hope. Following the death of Saman Kunan, King Maha Vajiralongkorn announced that he would sponsor his funeral.

After the rescue was completed, the boys' families, the rescue commander, military officials, and thousands of volunteers gathered at the cave entrance. The group gave thanks for the lives saved and asked forgiveness from the cave goddess "Jao Mae Tham" for the intrusion of pumps, ropes and people during the rescue.

Opinions about the assistant coach 
Some observers, primarily in Western media, questioned whether assistant coach Ekkaphon Kanthawong should face criminal charges for leading the group into the caves, despite the warning sign at the entrance stating that it is dangerous to enter between July and November. The boys had entered the cave on 23 June.

Local communities, as well as the boys' parents, emphasised that they did not blame the boys or their coach, as the rain had arrived a month earlier than usual. Vern Unsworth, a British caver mapping the cave, stated, "Nobody's to blame, not the coach, not the boys. They were just very unlucky... It wasn't just the rain that day, the mountain is like a sponge and waters from earlier rain were raising the levels". Unsworth said that he himself had been planning to make a solo venture into the complex on 24 June, when he received a telephone call saying the boys were missing there.

While the police chief told newspaper Khao Sod that he "hadn't ruled out" pressing negligence charges against the coach for putting the team in danger, no calls were made to take legal action against him. A number of lawyers stated that the coach would probably not face criminal charges, since Thai law also takes into consideration whether a person has malicious intent. In mainstream media, Ekkaphon has widely been held "a hero" and was a "calm voice [that] helped boys to beat despair in the darkness." The coach was reported to have treated the boys with care, giving them his food, helping them remain calm, and instructing them to drink the relatively clean water dripping from the cave walls instead of the murky floodwaters that trapped them.

When asked if Ekkaphon should be held legally responsible for negligence, Mongkhon Bunpiam, the father of 12-year-old Mongkhon, rejected the suggestion: "We would never do that... the boys love their coach... and we as parents don't want it either. Coach Eak has been good to my boy, and now I hear how he gave them hope, and kept them calm for so many days without food. I have great admiration for him." Tanawut Vibulrungruang, father of 11-year old Chanin, was reported to be "touched by the actions of the team's coach. Without him... he doesn't know how the kids could have survived." Head coach Nopparat said he would not have approved of the hike, but was confident in Ekkaphon's ability to take care of the boys. Prime Minister Prayut Chan-o-cha said that the emphasis should be on the rescue and the recovery of the team, and he asked the public to avoid a rush to judgment.

International
Over the course of two weeks, hundreds of volunteers, military specialists and corporate experts arrived from around the world to offer assistance in the rescue.
 : Six Australian Federal Police (AFP) Specialist Response Group divers, one Navy Clearance diver, one Australian Medical Assistance Team (AUSMAT) member and Department of Foreign Affairs and Trade Crisis Response Team officers. Up to 20 Australians were involved at the cave site. Doctor Richard Harris, an anaesthetist, was part of the medical team that determined the boys' fitness to make the  journey. Harris and his diving partner, retired veterinarian Doctor Craig Challen, both cave diving specialists, played key roles in the rescue. The Thai government provided Harris with diplomatic immunity to protect him in case anything went wrong with the sedation.
 : Ben Reymenants, the owner of a diving school in Phuket, contributed in cave diving capacity.
 : Erik Brown, a dive instructor from Vancouver, participated on the cave diving team.
 : A six-man team from the volunteer rescue organisation the Beijing Peaceland Foundation arrived on 29 June. The team brought rescue equipment including an underwater robot, diving equipment and a three-dimensional imager. A second Chinese team arrived on 30 June from the Green Boat Emergency Rescue organisation with expertise in search and rescue on mountains and in caves.
 : The government of the Czech Republic offered to provide a Czech manufacturer's high-performance pumps; the state has four such pumps, each with an output of 400 litres per second (1,440,000 L/h (380,000 US gal/h)). Upon inspection at the site, however, it was determined heavy-duty pumps could not be used due to unsuitable terrain.
 : Two Danish divers, Ivan Karadžić, who runs a diving center with Finnish Mikko Paasi, and Claus Rasmussen, a diving instructor, participated in the cave diving team.
 : Diver Mikko Paasi came to assist with rescue efforts.
 : Diver Maksym Polejaka assisted with the rescue efforts.
 : Diver Jim Warny assisted with the rescue efforts.
  Experts from the pump manufacturer Kirloskar Brothers provided technical advice on drainage and pumps.
 : Diver Rafael Aroush joined the diving team while emergency mobile communication devices were donated by Maxtech NetWorks.
 : Divers and engineers, including Shigeki Miyake, a drainage specialist of the Japan International Cooperation Agency in Thailand, assisted in efforts to pump water out of the cave.
 : Members of the Vientiane Rescue contributed to search and rescue efforts.
 : Drainage specialists were sent to aid water pumping efforts.
 : Diver Ross Schnauer assisted with the rescue efforts.
 : Ministry of Emergency Situations  readied a volunteer team including a rescue specialist.
 : Divers Vsevolod Korobov and Maksym Polejaka came to assist with rescue efforts.
 : The British Cave Rescue Council sent eight experienced cave rescue divers, some familiar with caves in Thailand, to lead the diving team; three cave rescue personnel; and special equipment. Vernon Unsworth, a British man living in the area, was the first person with caving expertise on the site. John Volanthen and Rick Stanton discovered the boys and led the cave diving team. Chris Jewell and Jason Mallinson brought  of diving equipment. Other divers involved included Connor Roe and Josh Bratchley. Other cave rescue personnel, Mike Clayton, and Gary Mitchell provided surface control for the divers, along with Robert Harper who had initially deployed among the first three UK divers. Tim Acton deployed as a friend of the Thai Navy SEALs.
 : On 28 June, the US military's Indo-Pacific Command (USINDOPACOM) deployed 36 personnel from Okinawa, including airmen from 353rd Special Operations Group and the 31st Rescue Squadron. According to Military.com, they joined seven other personnel, including a member of Joint US Military Advisory Group Thailand. Pentagon spokesman Colonel Rob Manning said that US personnel had "staged equipment and prepared the first three chambers of the cave for safe passage. The US contingent assisted in transporting the evacuees through the final chambers of the system, and provided medical personnel and other technical assistance to the rescue efforts."

Volunteers, teams and technical specialists from countries including Germany, Myanmar, the Philippines, Singapore, Spain, Sweden, and Ukraine, also participated in the operation. France offered to send a team of specialists and equipment, but Thai authorities believed that adequate resources were already on site.

The ordeal captured the media's attention from around the world. Over a period of three weeks, articles relating to the incident dominated the top stories section at many major news publications.

Sports world 
FIFA, via a letter from its president Gianni Infantino to the president of the Football Association of Thailand, invited the children and coach to the World Cup final if circumstances allowed. The entire team was expected to remain hospitalised for at least a week, and watched the final on television instead.  FC Barcelona invited the team to play in their international academy tournament in 2019 and to watch a first-team game at their home stadium Camp Nou. England and Manchester City F.C. defender Kyle Walker said he wanted to send them shirts, after spotting that one of the rescued boys was wearing a "Three Lions" jersey. In October 2018 the boys travelled to the UK as guests at Old Trafford for the Manchester United F.C. home match against Everton F.C. in the Premier League. The boys were invited by the IOC to the opening ceremony of the 2018 Summer Youth Olympics in Buenos Aires.

Elon Musk 
On July 3, 2018, a user on Twitter asked if Elon Musk could "assist in anyway to get the 12 Thailand boys and their coach out of the cave". In which the following day, Elon replied "I suspect that the Thai govt has this under control, but I'm happy to help if there is a way to do so".
 
By July 6, Elon commented that engineers for SpaceX and Boring Company were headed to Thailand to see if they could assist the government in the rescue.
 
On July 7, Elon claimed that they received good feedback from the cave experts in Thailand, which it later turned out that praise had been requested. It was revealed that he and his team had a plan to build a "tiny, kid-sized submarine" that would be made out of the liquid oxygen transfer tube from a Falcon rocket. The submarine would be light enough to be carried by two divers and small enough to fit through the narrow gaps while being robust.
 
Later that day, Elon mentioned construction on the submarine was complete and that it was on its way to Thailand.
 
On July 8, Elon shared a video of the submarine being tested in a pool through a simulated narrow passage.

By July 9, Elon would arrive at the rescue site, having visited Cave 3. He comments that the "mini-sub" was ready if needed and that it would be left in Thailand if they need it for the rescue or in the future.
 
By July 10, all 12 boys and their coach would be rescued by people with more adequate methods. The submarine was never used in the rescue and was left in Thailand for later use. His efforts were, however, mostly deemed a PR stunt.

Timeline

Legacy 

The head of the rescue mission and former governor of Chiang Rai province, said that the cave system would be turned into a living museum to highlight how the operation unfolded. Prime Minister Prayut Chan-o-cha acknowledged the statement but highlighted the concerns for tourist safety, stating that precautions would have to be added and correctly implemented both inside and outside to safeguard tourists.

Following the incident, Thailand's Navy SEALs will include cave-diving in their training regimen to be better prepared for similar emergencies.

Three of the boys and their assistant coach were stateless, and officials promised that they would be granted Thai citizenship within six months. On 26 September, the four were granted Thai citizenship. The Thai government has vowed to end statelessness by 2024.

Media

Books
 Aquanaut: A Life Beneath The Surface – The Inside Story of the Thai Cave Rescue (2021) by Rick Stanton
 Thirteen Lessons that Saved Thirteen Lives: The Thai Cave Rescue (2021) by John Volanthen
 Against All Odds by Craig Challen and Richard Harris
 All Thirteen -  a 2020 nonfiction children's book by American author Christina Soontornvat. It received positive reviews from critics and was awarded a Newbery Honor and a Sibert Honor in 2021.
 The Boys in the Cave (2018) by Matt Gutman
 The Great Cave Rescue (2018) by James Massola

Film and television 
 2018: Against The Elements: Tham Luang Cave Rescue, a documentary with exclusive interviews produced by Channel News Asia in Singapore.
 2018: Thai Cave Rescue, an episode of science television series Nova (season 45, episode 14).
 2019: The Cave, a feature film written and directed by Thai-Irish filmmaker Tom Waller. It features many of the real-life cave divers as themselves.
 2021: The Rescue, a National Geographic documentary released on 8 October 2021. The film made use of body-cam footage recorded by the divers involved in the operation.
 2022: Thirteen Lives, an Amazon Original film directed by Ron Howard (with a screenplay by William Nicholson) was released in theaters in July 2022 and on Amazon Prime in August 2022. The film rights were acquired in 2020 from Pure Flix. Filming began in Queensland, Australia in March 2021.
 2022: Thai Cave Rescue, a Netflix limited series was released on September 22, 2022. It is the only dramatic production that was granted access to the members of the Wild Boars.
 2022: The Trapped 13: How We Survived The Thai Cave, a Netflix documentary was released on October 5, 2022. The documentary features interviews with selected members of the Wild Boars team.

Song
A song about the rescue, "Heroes of Thailand" was written on 16 July 2018 by British music producer Will Robinson, with English and North Thailand dialect lyrics, and was performed by the Isan Project featuring Ronnarong Khampha.

Awards
 : On 24 July 2018, the Governor-General of Australia awarded the Bravery Medal to the six AFP Special Response Group divers and the Navy Clearance diver who supported the diving operation in the cave for "having displayed considerable bravery". Dr. Richard Harris and Craig Challen were awarded the Star of Courage for "having displayed conspicuous courage". All nine were awarded the Medal of the Order of Australia (OAM) for "service to the international community through their specialist response roles". On 25 January 2019, Challen and Harris were named Australians of the Year.
 : On 22 November 2018, Belgian diver Jim Warny was made a Knight of the Order of Leopold for his rescue efforts.
 : On 18 July 2018, the Thai Ambassador to Beijing hosted a luncheon for the Beijing Peaceland Foundation and Green Boat Emergency Rescue organization.
 :
 On 13 July 2018, the Commander-in-Chief of the Royal Thai Navy, in a letter of commendation, posthumously promoted former Navy SEAL Saman Kunan, who had died on 6 July, to Lieutenant Commander, and on 14 July, King Maha Vajiralongkorn awarded him with the Knight Grand Cross of the Most Exalted Order of the White Elephant. Commander of the Navy SEALs, Rear Admiral Apakorn Youkongkaew, and Navy SEAL Special Captain Anan Surawan, Commander of the First Special Warfare Corps, were cited in the letter of commendation by the Commander-in-Chief for their "outstanding performance, which sets the best example for others in the Thai Navy to follow". RADM Youkongkaew had commanded the overall activities of all divers during the operation and CAPT Surawan had commanded the operational center in Chamber 3. The commendation stated that 127 current and former Navy SEAL members and a 32-member medical team had participated in the rescue.
 On 7 September 2018, the Thai government hosted a reception for all Thai and foreign officials and personnel involved in the rescue. His Majesty the King granted a royal decoration, The Most Admirable Order of the Direkgunabhorn, to 188 people who were involved in the rescue of the football team—114 foreigners and 74 Thais. The Royal Thai Government Gazette has officially published the list of recipients of the Order of the Direkgunabhorn for Tham Luang cave rescue on 21 March 2019.
 :
 On 24 July 2018, Prime Minister Theresa May hosted a reception at 10 Downing Street with the Thai Ambassador for the British Cave Rescue Council divers and personnel involved in the rescue.
 In November 2018, the British cave rescue team were given the Pride of Britain 2018 award for "Outstanding Bravery". The rescued children attended the award ceremony in London.
 On 28 December 2018, seven British members of the rescue team were honoured in the 2019 New Year Honours. Stanton and Volanthen each received the George Medal; Jewell and Mallinson received the Queen's Gallantry Medal; and Josh Bratchley, Connor Roe and Vern Unsworth were appointed Members of the Order of the British Empire (MBE).
 Stanton, Volanthen, Harris, Mallinson and Jewell were the first ever recipients of the Medal of Valor from the Professional Association of Diving Instructors, an American organization.
 On 5 January 2019, the Asian Football Federation awarded the Wild Boars a two-year support program, which provided the club with technical support, training equipment and 100 Molten match balls a year. Three of the boys and their coach were invited to watch the match between Thailand and India at the 2019 AFC Asian Cup in the United Arab Emirates on 6 January 2019 as guests of honor.

See also
  (1907)
  (2004)
  (2006)
 
  (2014)

References

Further reading

External links

  documentary (55:44); 17 July 2018; ABC News (Australia)
 The Thai Kids Talk – live press conference with English translation (1:31:32; 18 July 2018; ABC News (Australia) on ABC iview) alternative link on Facebook
  – Rick Stanton account (03:42; 17 July 2018; ITV-News)
 Thai cave rescue (augmented reality) (21 July 2018; NYT)
 "Tham Luang Cave Rescue: Against The Elements", YouTube

 
2018 in Thailand
Cave diving
Caving incidents and rescues
Chiang Rai province
June 2018 events in Thailand
July 2018 events in Thailand
Underwater diving deaths
Accidents and incidents involving sports teams
Thai nationality law
Asia Game Changer Award winners
Articles containing video clips
2018 disasters in Thailand